Clivus (Latin for "slope", "rise") can refer to
 Clivus toilet
 Clivus (anatomy)
 Clivus (road), a kind of Roman road (e.g. the clivus suburanus)
 Clivus Capitolinus